Travers Christmas Humphreys, QC (15 February 1901 – 13 April 1983) was a British barrister who prosecuted several controversial cases in the 1940s and 1950s, and who later became a judge at the Old Bailey. He also wrote a number of works on Mahayana Buddhism and in his day was the best-known British convert to Buddhism. In 1924 he founded what became the London Buddhist Society, which was to have a seminal influence on the growth of the Buddhist tradition in Britain. His former home in St John's Wood, London, is now a Buddhist temple. He was an enthusiastic proponent of the Oxfordian theory of Shakespeare authorship.

Early life
Humphreys was born in Ealing, Middlesex, the son of Travers Humphreys, a noted barrister and judge. His given name "Christmas" is unusual, but, along with "Travers", had a long history in the Humphreys family. Among friends and family he was generally known as 'Toby'. He was educated at Malvern College, where he first became a theosophist, and at Trinity Hall, Cambridge.

Theosophy and buddhism 
The death of his elder brother shocked Humphreys into reflection about his beliefs, and at age 17 he found himself drawn to Buddhism. In 1924, Humphreys founded the London Buddhist Lodge (later the Buddhist Society). The impetus came from several theosophists with whom Humphreys corresponded, chief among them being Annie Besant (President of the Theosophical Society 1907-1933) and George S. Arundale (President 1933-1947). Both at his home and at the lodge he played host to a variety of spiritual authorities and writers including Nicholas Roerich, Sarvapalli Radhakrishnan, Alice Bailey and D.T. Suzuki. Other regular visitors in the 1930s were the Russian singer Vladimir Rosing and the philosopher Alan Watts. In 1931 Humphreys met the spiritual teacher Meher Baba. 

The Buddhist Society is one of the oldest Buddhist organisations outside Asia with Western founders.

In 1945, Humphreys drafted the Twelve Principles of Buddhism for which he obtained the approval of all the Buddhist sects in Japan (including the Shin Sect which was not associated with Olcott's common platform), the Supreme Patriarch of Thailand, and leading Buddhists of Ceylon, Burma, China, and Tibet.

In the same year, Humphreys received the news of the death of one of his mentors, George S. Arundale. He later assembled and collated some of Arundale's unpublished works, a collection of which he left to the Theosophical Society on his death in 1983.

Legal career
Humphreys was called to the bar by the Inner Temple in 1924. When first qualified, he tended to take criminal defence work, making use of his skills in cross-examination. In 1934, he was appointed Junior Treasury Counsel at the Central Criminal Court ("the Old Bailey").

Humphreys became Recorder of Deal in 1942, a part-time judicial post. In the aftermath of World War II, he became an assistant prosecutor in the War Crimes trials held in Tokyo. In 1950 he was appointed Senior Treasury Counsel, in which role he led for the Crown in some of the causes célèbre of the era, including the cases of Craig & Bentley and Ruth Ellis. It was he who secured the conviction of Timothy Evans for a murder later found to have been carried out by John Christie. All three cases played a part in the later abolition of capital punishment in the United Kingdom. 

At the 1950 trial of the nuclear spy Klaus Fuchs, Humphreys was the prosecuting counsel for the Attorney General. In 1955, he was made a Bencher of his Inn and the next year became Recorder of Guildford.

In 1962 Humphreys became a Commissioner at the Old Bailey. He was appointed an Additional Judge there in 1968 and served on the bench until his retirement in 1976. Increasingly he became willing to court controversy with his judicial pronouncements. In 1975, he passed a six-month suspended jail sentence on an 18-year-old man convicted of raping two women at knife-point. The leniency of the sentence created a public outcry. His sentence of a man to eighteen months in jail for a fraud shortly afterwards added to the controversy.

The Lord Chancellor defended Humphreys in the face of a House of Commons motion to dismiss him, and he also received support from the National Association of Probation Officers. However, pressure was put on him to resign, which he did some six months after the controversy.

Literary and arts career
Humphreys was a prolific author of books on the Buddhist tradition. He was also president of the Shakespeare Fellowship, a position to which he was elected in 1955. The Fellowship advanced the theory that the plays generally attributed to Shakespeare were in fact the work of Edward de Vere, 17th Earl of Oxford. Under Humphreys the fellowship changed its name to the Shakespeare Authorship Society. He helped found the Ballet Guild in 1941 and acted as its chairman. 

In 1962 Humphreys was appointed Vice-President of the Tibet Society, and made Joint Vice-Chairman of the Royal India, Pakistan and Ceylon Society.

Humphreys published his autobiography Both Sides of the Circle in 1978. He also wrote poetry, especially verses inspired by his Buddhist beliefs, one of which posed the question: When I die, who dies?

Death 
Humphreys died at his London home, 58 Marlborough Place, St John's Wood.

Portrayal in film 
Humphreys was portrayed on screen by Geoffrey Chater in the 1971 film 10 Rillington Place, about the Evans–Christie murder case.

Published works

As author
An Invitation to the Buddhist Way of Life for Western Readers
Both Sides of the Circle (1978) London: Allen & Unwin (autobiography) 
Buddhism: An Introduction and Guide
Buddhism: The History, Development and Present Day Teaching of the Various Schools
Buddhist Poems: a Selection, 1920–1970 (1971) London: Allen & Unwin, 
A Buddhist Students' Manual
The Buddhist Way of Action
The Buddhist Way of Life
Concentration and Meditation: A Manual of Mind Development
The Development of Buddhism in England: Being a History of the Buddhist Movement in London and the Provinces (1937)
Exploring Buddhism
The Field of Theosophy
The Great Pearl Robbery of 1913: A Record of Fact (1929)An Invitation to the Buddhist Way of Life for Western Readers (1971)Karma and Rebirth (1948)The Menace in our Midst: With Some Criticisms and Comments, Relevant and IrrelevantOne Hundred treasures of the Buddhist Society, London (1964)Poems I RememberPoems of Peace and War (1941) London: The Favil PressA Popular Dictionary of BuddhismA Religion for Modern Youth (1930)The Search WithinSeven Murderers (1931) London: HeinemannSixty Years of Buddhism in England (1907–1967): A History and a SurveyStudies in the Middle Way: Being Thoughts on Buddhism AppliedThe Sutra of Wei Lang (or Hui Neng) (1944)Via TokyoWalk OnThe Way of Action: The Buddha's Way to EnlightenmentThe Way of Action: A Working Philosophy for Western LifeA Western Approach to Zen: An EnquiryThe Wisdom of BuddhismZen A Way of LifeZen BuddhismZen Comes West: The Present and Future of Zen Buddhism in BritainZen Comes West: Zen Buddhism in Western SocietyAs editor
(editor of works by Daisetz Taitaro Suzuki):Awakening of ZenEssays in Zen Buddhism (The Complete Works of D. T. Suzuki)An Introduction to Zen BuddhismLiving by ZenStudies in ZenThe Zen Doctrine of No Mind: The Significance of the Sutra of Hui-Neng (Wei-Lang)As co-editorThe Secret Doctrine by H.P. BlavatskyThe Mahatma Letters to A.P. SinnettForewords and prefacesBuddhism in Britain by Ian P. Oliver, (1979) London: Rider & Company, Diamond Sutra and the Sutra of Hui-neng (Shambhala Classics) by W. Y. Evans-Wentz (foreword), Christmas Humphreys (foreword), Wong Mou-Lam (translator), A F Price (translator)Essays In Zen Buddhism (Third Series) by D. T. SuzukiLiving Zen by Robert LinssenMahayana Buddhism: A Brief Outline by Beatrice Lane SuzukiSome Sayings of the Buddha''

See also
Buddhism and Theosophy
Buddhism in the United Kingdom

References

External links
Biography of Christmas Humphreys
"Christmas Humphreys: A Buddhist Judge in Twentieth Century London" Damien P. Horigan Korean Journal of Comparative Law 24, 1–16

20th-century Buddhists
1901 births
1983 deaths
20th-century English judges
Alumni of Trinity Hall, Cambridge
English Buddhists
Converts to Buddhism
Mahayana Buddhism writers
People educated at Malvern College
People from Ealing
Shakespearean scholars
20th-century poets
English King's Counsel